Pablo Carreño is the defending champion.

Seeds

Draw

Finals

Top half

Bottom half

References
 Main Draw
 Qualifying Draw

Morocco Tennis Tour - Mohammedia - Singles
2015 - Singles
2015 Morocco Tennis Tour